The  San Diego Chargers season was the franchise's 17th season in the National Football League (NFL), and its 27th overall. the team failed to improve on their 8–8 record from 1985. Following a stagnant 1–7 start, Head Coach Don Coryell was fired and Al Saunders was named interim Head Coach. After the season, Saunders was named the permanent Head Coach and would hold the position through the end of the 1988 season. Leslie O'Neal was named Defensive Rookie of the Year.

NFL Draft

Roster

Regular season

Schedule

Note: Intra-division opponents are in bold text.

Game summaries

Week 1 vs Dolphins

Standings

Awards and honors
 Leslie O'Neal, Defensive Rookie of the Year

San Diego Chargers
San Diego Chargers seasons
San Diego Chargers f